Dundalk entered the 1978–79 season, having won the previous season's League Cup and Leinster Senior Cup. But they had finished in a disappointing 11th place in the League, which meant there would be no European football in the new season. 1978–79 was Jim McLaughlin's fifth season as manager, and was Dundalk's 53rd consecutive season in the top tier of Irish football.

Season summary
The previous season had been dogged by an early season row over player expenses, which had seen two players depart acrimoniously; while the death of club stalwart Brian McConville after returning home from a match in January 1978 had further affected the club. There were rumours that McLaughlin would be let go, despite retaining the Leinster Cup, and winning their first League Cup in a penalty shoot-out over Cork Alberts. Instead, the club supported the "reorganisation" he demanded, and used funds from the sale of three players (Synan Braddish, Derek Carroll and Brian Duff) to Liverpool, for a combined £55,000, to rebuild the squad and make ground improvements at Oriel.

The new season opened inauspiciously, with both the League Cup and the Leinster Cup being surrendered in their respective first rounds in early September. The League schedule commenced on 10 September 1978 and Dundalk continued their slow start, dropping points in eight of the first 15 matches to lie in fourth position. But, starting with a win over Shamrock Rovers on Christmas Eve, they only dropped three points from the next 14 matches to surge to the title with a game to spare. It was confirmed in slightly surreal fashion – with a win away to Cork Celtic (who were about to be expelled from the League) in front of 200 people; while the trophy was presented in Oriel Park 48 hours later after a final-day defeat to FAI Cup final opponents Waterford. Having made light work of reaching the 1979 FAI Cup Final, they defeated Waterford 2–0, thereby completing the club's first League and Cup Double.

First-Team Squad (1978–79)
Sources:

Competitions

League Cup
Source:
First round

Leinster Senior Cup
Source:
First Round

FAI Cup
Source:
First Round

Quarter Final

Semi Final

Final

League
Source:

League table

Awards

Player of the Month

References
Bibliography

Citations

External links
Dundalk F.C. on YouTube
FAI Cup Final report on RTE evening news (YouTube)

Dundalk F.C. seasons
Dundalk